Suberoyl chloride is an organic compound with the formula (CH2)6(COCl)2. It is the diacid chloride derivative of suberic acid. It is a colorless liquid although aged samples appear yellow or even brown.

Uses
Suberoyl chloride is used as a reagent to synthesize hydroxyferrocifen hybrid compounds that have antiproliferative activity against triple negative breast cancer cells. It is also used as a cross-linking agent to cross-link chitosan membranes, and also improves the membrane's integrity.

References

External links 
 MSDS Safety data (PDF)

Acyl chlorides